Gama or Da Gama may refer to:

People
Gama (surname), for people with the surname Gama
Gama Singh (born 1954), Canadian wrestler
The Great Gama (1882–1960), wrestler from Punjab

Places
Gama, Federal District, in Brazil
Gama, Burkina Faso
Gama, Cundinamarca, in Colombia
Gama, Senegal
Gama, Guinea
Gama Rural LLG, in Papua New Guinea

Other
 Gama (carriage), a traditional Korean litter
 Gama (EP), a 2005 EP by The Gazette
 Gama (Naruto), a character in the anime Naruto
 Gama Aviation, a company based in the United Kingdom
 Gama Goat, a semi-amphibious off-road vehicle
 GAMA Platform, a scientific platform for building spatially explicit agent-based simulations
 Gama Toys, a German tinplate and diecast toy manufacturer
 GAMA Industry, a Turkish construction company
 Da Gama Dam, a dam on the Witwaters River, South Africa
 Da Gama Park, a town in City of Cape Town Metropolitan Municipality, South Africa
 Buttumak, a traditional Korean kitchen stove
 Galaxy And Mass Assembly survey, a galaxy survey of data from a number of astronomical instruments
 Game Manufacturers Association, a non-profit trade association
 General Aviation Manufacturers Association, non-profit trade association
 Groundwater Ambient Monitoring and Assessment Program
 Sociedade Esportiva do Gama, Brazilian football club

See also
Vasco da Gama (disambiguation)
Gamma (disambiguation)